Hormizd (Middle Persian; in  Hormisdas, Ormisdas) was a Sassanid Persian prince, the third son of King Hormizd II and brother-in-law of King Shapur II. Imprisoned by him, he was freed by his wife in 323 and escaped to Constantinople, where Roman Emperor Constantine I helped him and gave him a palace near the shore of the Marmara Sea. This palace became an important toponym of the city: its neighborhood (where the mosque of Little Hagia Sophia still stands) was known in Byzantine times as en tois Hormisdou, meaning "near the houses of Hormisdas". The palace became later the private residence of Byzantine Emperor Justinian I, before his accession to the throne.

In 363, Hormizd served against Persia in the army of the Emperor Julian (361–363); in turn, his son, of the same name, later served as proconsul (Ammianus Marcellinus 26.8.12).

References

Sources

 
 

Sasanian princes
4th-century Byzantine people
4th-century Iranian people
Year of birth unknown
Year of death unknown
Rebellions against the Sasanian Empire
Byzantine military personnel
Byzantine people of Iranian descent
Iranian defectors
People of the Roman–Sasanian Wars
Julian's Persian expedition
Roman–Iranian relations